Kay Edwin Emmert Kuter (April 25, 1926 – November 12, 2003) was an American actor who appeared on television and in films. He is mostly recognized for his role as farmer Newt Kiley on the CBS sitcoms Green Acres and Petticoat Junction, which shared several characters.

The son of famed Hollywood art director Leo K. Kuter and silent screen actress Evelyn Edler, Kuter was born in Los Angeles, California. He performed mostly as a serious actor or "heavy" in many 1960s series, often in a beard, before taking a recurring roles on the two series.

He appeared in many films, including The Last Starfighter as Enduran, Warlock and Gross Anatomy. His last film role was in the 2004 film Forbidden Warrior. He also provided voice work for kids' films, including providing the voice of Santa Claus in Annabelle's Wish and the voice of Grimsby in The Little Mermaid II: Return to the Sea, replacing Ben Wright, who died in 1989.

In his later years, he did extensive voice acting in video games, including playing the bartender Griswold Goodsoup in The Curse of Monkey Island and Dockmaster Velasco / the casino croupier in Grim Fandango, both well-known LucasArts Adventure games of the 1990s. He was probably best known to video game fans as Werner Huber in The Beast Within: A Gabriel Knight Mystery. He was the voice of "Hershey's Kisses" commercials for 14 years.

He made guest appearances on many television series, including The Rifleman, Bonanza, Perry Mason,  Gunsmoke, Beyond Belief: Fact or Fiction as Anatole in the twelfth episode of the third season, Star Trek: The Next Generation as a Cytherian in the season four episode "The Nth Degree", and in Star Trek: Deep Space Nine as the Bajoran Sirah in the first-season episode "The Storyteller". He also appeared on ER, the Charmed episode "Happily Ever After", the Outer Limits episode "The Premonition" as a "Limbo Being" caught in time, Seinfeld as the Latvian Orthodox priest, The X-Files episode "The Calusari" as the head Calusari, and Frasier as a vagrant who wants a kiss from Martin Crane.

Kuter died on November 12, 2003, from pulmonary complications at St. Joseph's Hospital in Burbank, California. He was 78, and his death came only four months after his mother's passing at age 103.  He was survived by his sister Jeane Kuter Harvey of Las Vegas, Nevada; and by nieces and nephews and great nieces and nephews. He is buried in Forest Lawn - Hollywood Hills Cemetery.

Filmography

Sabrina (1954) - Ernest - Houseman (uncredited)
Drum Beat (1954) - Veteran Soldier (uncredited)
Désirée (1954) - Lackey (uncredited)
City of Shadows (1955) - Bartender Kink
The Cobweb (1955) - Patient (uncredited)
Guys and Dolls (1955) - Calvin
The Steel Jungle (1956) - Stringbean
The Mole People (1956) - Priest (uncredited)
The True Story of Jesse James (1957) - Fleming (uncredited)
Designing Woman (1957) - Hotel Clerk (uncredited)
Under Fire (1957) - Pvt. Arnold Swanson (uncredited)
The Light in the Forest (1958) - Fiddler (uncredited)
The FBI Story (1959) - Barber (uncredited)
The Big Night (1960) - Mailman
A Time for Killing (1967) - Owelson
Watermelon Man (1970) - Dr. Wainwright
An Enemy of the People (1978)
The Last Starfighter (1984) - Ambassador Enduran
Zombie High (1987) - Dean Eisner
Frankenstein General Hospital (1988) - Larry
Warlock (1989) - Proctor
Gross Anatomy (1989) - Lecturing Professor
Star Trek: The Next Generation (1991, TV Series) - Cytherian (S4:E19 "The Nth Degree") 
Love Field (1992) - Announcer (voice)
The Seventh Coin (1993) - Professor Walker
Star Trek: Deep Space Nine (1993, TV Series) - Sirah (S1:E13 "The Storyteller") 
Babe (1995) - Man Sitting in Crowd at Sheep Trial (uncredited)
Annabelle's Wish (1997) - Santa Claus (voice)
Grim Fandango (1998) - Dockmaster Velasco (voice)
The Little Mermaid II: Return to the Sea (2000) - Grimsby (voice)
The Hollywood Sign (2001) - Robbie Kant
Grand Theft Parsons (2003) - Undertaker
Forbidden Warrior (2005) - Yawn (final film role)

References

External links
 
 

1925 births
2003 deaths
Male actors from Los Angeles
American male film actors
American male television actors
American male video game actors
American male voice actors
Burials at Forest Lawn Memorial Park (Hollywood Hills)
20th-century American male actors
21st-century American male actors